Adedapo Oluseun Abiodun  (born 29 May 1960) is a Nigerian businessman and politician, who has served as Governor of Ogun State since 2019. He won the 2019 general elections under the platform of the All Progressive Congress. 

He was the board Chairman of the Corporate Affairs Commission. Prior to his assumption of office, he was the managing director of Heyden Petroleum and the founder of First Power Limited. On 10 March 2019, he was declared Governor-Elect of Ogun State by the Independent National Electoral Commission.

Early life
Abiodun was born on 29 May 1960 in Iperu Remo, Ogun State, to the royal family of Iperu. He was born into the family of Dr. Emmanuel Abiodun and Mrs. Victoria Abiodun from Iperu Remo, in Ogun East senatorial district.

Education
The educational background of Abiodun remains unclear. He was involved in a certificate scandal in the build up to the 2019 general elections when he claimed in the 2015 senatorial election form for Ogun East to have graduated from Obafemi Awolowo University, but in the 2019 governorship form, he claimed to possess only secondary school certificate of education.

In an interview with Seun Okinbaloye on channels television in December 2018, Abiodun"Claimed To Have Never Gotten A Degree From Obafemi Awolowo University". He claimed to have been a student of the institution but didn't graduate from the school

Career
He is the managing director/CEO of the Nigerian oil and gas company Heyden Petroleum Ltd (HPL). He is also reportedly the founder of First Power Limited.

Politics
Abiodun is a founding member of Peoples Democratic Party (PDP) in Ogun State, although he is currently a member of the All Progressive Congress (APC) defecting after the 2015 general elections. He contested the Ogun East senatorial seat on the platform of the All Progressive Congress (APC) in the 2015 Nigerian general elections which he lost to the Peoples Democratic Party (PDP) candidate. He was elected a senator of the Federal Republic of Nigeria on the platform of the defunct United Nigeria Congress Party (UNCP) in 1998. He has served as a member of various presidential committees and organisations.

In 2019, he contested in the gubernatorial elections in Ogun state and won, under the platform of the All Progressive Congress (APC).

He was sworn in as Governor of Ogun State on 29 May 2019.

He is a born again Christian and worships with the Mountain of Fire and Miracle Ministry. He has testified that despite much opposition to him getting into the office of Ogun state governor God still got him there.

Controversies 

In 2018, the Cable Newspaper alleged that Abiodun was involved in certificate forgery.

As a result of the Pandora Papers leaks, the Premium Times reported on Abiodun's involvement in two offshore companies known tax haven, the British Virgin Islands. The report noted that Abiodun owned and was the sole director of both Marlowes Trading Corporation and Heyden Petroleum Limited in apparent violation of the Code of Conduct Bureau and Tribunal Act as neither company was declared when Abiodun was elected Governor. Abiodun himself avoided questions on the topic but an associate of Abiodun claimed that the governor had meant to dissolve the companies but didn't notice that they had not been dissolved yet.
http://saharareporters.com/2022/04/27/ogun-governor-abiodun-confirms-he-was-arrested-fraud-usa-warns-apc-party-not-disqualify
SaharaReporters had in March 2022 published the criminal record of how Abiodun was jailed in 1986 for credit card fraud in Miami Dade Florida, USA.

The governor was said to have used a pseudo name (Shawn Michael Davids) with the aim of concealing his criminal identity.

The record revealed that Abiodun was jailed for committing criminal offences which bordered on credit card fraud, petty theft and check forgery.

He was arrested on November 7, 1986, for fighting and injuring a police officer in an attempt to resist arrest.

While being processed at the station, his fingerprint was run through the crime database and it was discovered that the Adedapo Oluseun Abiodun being processed for detention was the same as Shawn Michael Davids.

His criminal record and history were thus cemented and he was jailed.

According to some documents obtained by SaharaReporters, Abiodun's jail number was 8600B9436.</ref> http://saharareporters.com/2022/04/27/ogun-governor-abiodun-confirms-he-was-arrested-fraud-usa-warns-apc-party-not-disqualify

Personal life
Abiodun married Bamidele Abiodun in 1990 and had five children, including the late Olugbenga Abiodun, a Nigerian DJ also known as DJ Olu.

See also
List of Governors of Ogun State

References 

18.http://saharareporters.com/2022/04/27/ogun-governor-abiodun-confirms-he-was-arrested-fraud-usa-warns-apc-party-not-disqualify

1960 births
Living people
Yoruba businesspeople
Nigerian businesspeople in the oil industry
Yoruba politicians
Politicians from Ogun State
Obafemi Awolowo University alumni
Kennesaw State University alumni
Ekiti State University alumni
All Progressives Congress state governors of Nigeria